Wenden may refer to:
 , a town district within Wenden-Thune-Harxbüttel, Germany
Wenden (Sauerland), Germany
 , a borough in Brunswick, Germany
Wenden, Arizona
Cēsis, Latvia (previously Wenden in German)
Wenden Voivodeship, administrative unit of the Polish-Lithuanian Commonwealth
Kreis Wenden, administrative unit of the Russian Empire
The German name for the Wends, Slavs living near Germanic settlement areas
The historical Duchy of Wenden or Werle now part of the German state Mecklenburg-Vorpommern
Michael Wenden (born 1949), Australian Olympic swimmer

See also
Battle of Wenden (disambiguation)
Wendens Ambo, a village in Essex, England
Wende (disambiguation)